Dyschirius euxinus is a species of ground beetle in the subfamily Scaritinae. It was described by Znojko in 1927.

References

euxinus
Beetles described in 1927